St. Pauli Roller Derby is a flat track roller derby league based in Hamburg in Germany.  It consists of two trip teams, an A team and a B team, which compete against teams from other leagues. They are called Harbor Girls A and Harbor Girls B respectively.

St. Pauli Roller Derby is the follow-up club to the Harbor Girls e.V., which was an independent roller derby club before it became part of FC St. Pauli and changed its name.

The Harbor Girls were founded by Spooky Spiky and Killing Zoe, the former had previously skated with the Stuttgart Valley Rollergirlz.  By mid-2011, the league had thirty skaters.

"Heavy Miss Gale", a skater from the league, was selected for the German national team for the 2011 Roller Derby World Cup.

In the 2014 World Championship, four player from SPRD were selected to play in the Dallas roster: Ostblocker, Jeanne Dark, Knock 'n' Rose and Lotta Loveless.

References

 

Roller derby leagues in Germany
Roller derby leagues established in 2008
Sport in Hamburg
2008 establishments in Germany